A list of films produced in Egypt in 1969. For an A-Z list of films currently on Wikipedia, see :Category:Egyptian films.

1969

External links
 Egyptian films of 1969 at the Internet Movie Database
 Egyptian films of 1969 at elCinema.com

Lists of Egyptian films by year
1969 in Egypt
Lists of 1969 films by country or language